Mink is a group of semi-aquatic furry mammals.

Mink may also refer to:

Entertainment 
 mink (director) or Christopher Morrison, American film director and graphic novel writer
 Mink (singer) (born 1984), Japanese-Korean singer
 Mink (comics), a character in the Marvel Comics series Squadron Supreme
 Mink (manga), a magical-girl manga by Megumi Tachikawa
 Mink, protagonist of the manga Dragon Half
 The Mink Tribe, a race of anthropomorphic, furry mammals in One Piece

Geography
 Mink Lake (Lane County, Oregon)
 Mink River, a freshwater estuary in Door County, Wisconsin

 MINK, a territory band comprising Minnesota, Iowa, Nebraska, and Kansas
 Mink, Louisiana, the last town in America to get phone service
 Mink Brook, a tributary of the Connecticut River
 Mink Peak, a mountain in Antarctica
 Mink Lake (disambiguation)
 Mink Creek (disambiguation)

People
 Mink Stole (born 1947), American actress
 Mink Nutcharut (formally Nutcharut Wongharuthai, born 1999), a Thai female professional snooker player
 Mink (surname)

Other uses 
 USS Mink (IX-123), an American navy vessel
 Mink Building, in the Harlem/Manhattanville neighborhood of New York City
 Mink frog, a small species of frog native to the United States and Canada
 Sea mink, an extinct North American member of the family Mustelidae
 Mink (HBC vessel), operated by the HBC from 1872-1904, see Hudson's Bay Company vessels